Miltiradiene synthase (EC 4.2.3.131, SmMDS, SmiKSL) is an enzyme with systematic name (+)-copaly-diphosphate diphosphate-lyase (cyclizing, miltiradiene-forming). This enzyme catalyses the following chemical reaction

 (+)-copalyl diphosphate  miltiradiene + diphosphate

This enzyme is isolated from the plant Selaginella moellendorffii.

References

External links 
 

EC 4.2.3